Kalateh-ye Said (also Romanized as Kalāteh-ye Sa‘īd; also known as Kalāteh-ye Seyyed and Kalāteh-ye Sefīd) is a village in Zaveh Rural District, in the Central District of Zaveh County, Razavi Khorasan Province, Iran. At the 2006 census, its population was 63, in 18 families.

References 

Populated places in Zaveh County